Jonathan Joss (born December 22, 1965) is an American actor. He is best known for portraying the voice of John Redcorn from season 2 to 13 of the animated series King of the Hill, replacing the original actor Victor Aaron after his death in 1996. He is also known for his recurring role as Chief Ken Hotate in Parks and Recreation.

Joss was born in San Antonio, Texas, where he attended McCollum High School, and later enrolled at Texas State University–San Marcos (then Southwest Texas State University) but left before graduating. Joss later attended San Antonio College, before graduating from Our Lady of the Lake University with a degree in theater and speech.

Joss is also a musician, and performs as part of The Red Corn Band, a reference to the character he played in King of the Hill.

Filmography

Film

Television

Video games

External links

References

1965 births
Living people
American male film actors
American male television actors
American male voice actors
American people of Spanish descent
Grammy Award winners
Male actors from San Antonio
Our Lady of the Lake University alumni
Texas State University alumni
20th-century American male actors
21st-century American male actors